Lozovoye is a rural locality (a selo) in Sadovsky Selsoviet of Tambovsky District, Amur Oblast, Russia. The population was 821 as of 2018. There are 12 streets.

Geography 
Lozovoye is located 23 km northwest of Tambovka (the district's administrative centre) by road. Tolstovka is the nearest rural locality.

References 

Rural localities in Tambovsky District, Amur Oblast